St. Mark's Episcopal Church is a historic Episcopal church at the junction of N. Bedford Rd. and E. Main Street in Mt. Kisco, Westchester County, New York. It was designed by architect Bertram Goodhue in 1907 and built from 1909 to 1913 in the late Gothic Revival style.  The church was expanded in 1927–1928.  It is a two-story building constructed of square cut local granite and schist.  It has carved limestone trim and copings and a statue of St. Mark by Lee Lawrie.  Its intersecting gable roof is covered by green and purple slate shingles. A tower was added in 1919–1920. Connected to the church is a contributing parish hall.

The church has an organ built by Aeolian-Skinner Organ Company  Three stained glass windows were executed by the Tiffany Studio.

It was added to the National Register of Historic Places in 1991.

See also
National Register of Historic Places listings in northern Westchester County, New York

References

External links

St. Mark's Episcopal Church website

Churches completed in 1913
20th-century Episcopal church buildings
Episcopal church buildings in New York (state)
Churches on the National Register of Historic Places in New York (state)
National Register of Historic Places in Westchester County, New York
Gothic Revival church buildings in New York (state)
Churches in Westchester County, New York
1913 establishments in New York (state)
Mount Kisco, New York